Wysoki Stoczek is one of the districts of Białystok in Poland.

History
At the end of the 1970s, Housing Cooperative "Rodzina Kolejowa" started building the first part of the district, then known as 'Wysoki Stoczek Południe', in the areas of  Scaleniowa, Fiedorowicza and Gromadzka streets. In accordance with the resolution of the meeting of Members' Representatives, on 1 January 1989 from part of the resources of the Wysoki Stoczek Południe estate, a new independent cooperative was created called "Bacieczki" in the area of Swobodna, Szeroka and Łagodna streets.

References

External links 

Districts of Białystok